Joel Tippett (born 26 October 1988) is a former professional Australian rules footballer who played for the Gold Coast Football Club and North Melbourne Football Club in the Australian Football League (AFL). He was listed with the Brisbane Lions from 2007 to 2009, however, he did not play a senior match for them.

After that he moved to South Australia where he joined West Adelaide in the South Australian National Football League.  He played 21 games in the 2012 season, and has continued to play into 2013. 

He is the brother of Sydney Swans player Kurt Tippett and professional Netball player Gretel Bueta. Tippett was chosen by North Melbourne Football Club in the 2013 AFL Pre-Season Rookie Draft at pick 8. He made his debut for North Melbourne in the Round 6 Anzac Day win against Fremantle at Subiaco Oval. In Tippett's sixth AFL game against Geelong he tore his pectoral muscle. At the conclusion of the 2016 season, he was delisted by North Melbourne.

After he was delisted by North Melbourne he managed to find himself on Williamstown VFL list. He now teaches Health and PE to high school students.

Statistics
 

|- style="background-color: #EAEAEA"
! scope="row" style="text-align:center" | 2007
|
| – || 0 || – || – || – || – || – || – || – || – || – || – || – || – || – || –
|-
! scope="row" style="text-align:center" | 2008
|
| – || 0 || – || – || – || – || – || – || – || – || – || – || – || – || – || –
|- style="background-color: #EAEAEA"
! scope="row" style="text-align:center" | 2009
|
| – || 0 || – || – || – || – || – || – || – || – || – || – || – || – || – || –
|-
! scope="row" style="text-align:center" | 2011
|
| 52 || 2 || 0 || 0 || 5 || 6 || 11 || 4 || 4 || 0.0 || 0.0 || 2.5 || 3.0 || 5.5 || 2.0 || 2.0
|- style="background-color: #EAEAEA"
! scope="row" style="text-align:center" | 2014
|
| 36 || 4 || 0 || 0 || 17 || 14 || 31 || 10 || 4 || 0.0 || 0.0 || 4.3 || 3.5 || 7.8 || 2.5 || 1.0
|-
! scope="row" style="text-align:center" | 2015
|
| 36 || 3 || 0 || 0 || 12 || 9 || 21 || 6 || 4 || 0.0 || 0.0 || 4.0 || 3.0 || 7.0 || 2.0 || 1.3
|- style="background-color: #EAEAEA"
! scope="row" style="text-align:center" | 2016
|
| 36 || 0 || – || – || – || – || – || – || – || – || – || – || – || – || – || –
|- class="sortbottom"
! colspan=3| Career
! 9
! 0
! 0
! 34
! 29
! 63
! 20
! 12
! 0.0
! 0.0
! 3.8
! 3.2
! 7.0
! 2.2
! 1.3
|}

References

External links

1988 births
Living people
Sportspeople from the Gold Coast, Queensland
Gold Coast Football Club players
North Melbourne Football Club players
Australian rules footballers from Queensland
West Adelaide Football Club players
Southport Australian Football Club players
Werribee Football Club players
North Ballarat Football Club players
Williamstown Football Club players